Rangunia is a town in Chittagong District in the division of Chittagong. It is the administrative headquarter and urban centre of Rangunia Upazila.

References

Towns in Bangladesh
2000 establishments in Bangladesh